Timur Timurovich Zakirov (born 12 April 1996) is a Russian football player.

Club career
He made his debut in the Russian Professional Football League for FC Kuban-2 Krasnodar on 12 August 2016 in a game against FC Rotor Volgograd.

He made his debut for the main squad of FC Kuban Krasnodar on 24 August 2016 in a Russian Cup game against FC Energomash Belgorod.

Personal life
His father, also named Timur Zakirov, was also a professional footballer.

References

External links
 Profile by Russian Professional Football League

1996 births
People from Anapa
Living people
Russian footballers
Association football defenders
FC Kuban Krasnodar players
FC KAMAZ Naberezhnye Chelny players
FC Urozhay Krasnodar players
Sportspeople from Krasnodar Krai